The Stolen Soprano is a 1965 comedy novel by the British writer Compton Mackenzie. It was his penultimate novel, followed by Paper Lives in 1966.

References

Bibliography
 David Joseph Dooley. Compton Mackenzie. Twayne Publishers, 1974.

1965 British novels
Novels by Compton Mackenzie
Chatto & Windus books